Cardiff is the capital and largest city in Wales. The county, which takes in a number of smaller settlements around the city, has 28 scheduled monuments. These include sites from every period of Welsh history, from the Neolithic onwards. With four hillforts, six castles and six coastal/port sites, they reflect Cardiff's military and strategic role within South Wales. All but one of the sites on this list are within the historic county of Glamorgan. (A small part of the modern unitary authority area was formerly part of Monmouthshire.)

Scheduled monuments have statutory protection. The compilation of the list is undertaken by Cadw Welsh Historic Monuments, which is an executive agency of the National Assembly of Wales. The list of scheduled monuments below is supplied by Cadw with additional material from RCAHMW and Glamorgan-Gwent Archaeological Trust.

Scheduled monuments in Cardiff

See also
Listed buildings in Cardiff
List of Cadw properties
List of castles in Wales
List of hill forts in Wales
Historic houses in Wales
List of monastic houses in Wales
List of museums in Wales
List of Roman villas in Wales

References
Coflein is the online database of RCAHMW: Royal Commission on the Ancient and Historical Monuments of Wales, GGAT is the Glamorgan-Gwent Archaeological Trust, Cadw is the Welsh Historic Monuments Agency

Cardiff
Scheduled monuments in Cardiff
Scheduled Monuments